Soraya French (born 1957) is an Iranian artist known for her vivid use of colour in acrylic based multimedia and she has produced six books 30 Minute Acrylics, and Dynamic Acrylics and an instructional DVD.

Work 
She is a regular contributor to The Artist magazine and regularly holds painting workshops in her studio at Project Workshops. She is a demonstrator for GOLDEN artist colors.

She is the President of the Society of Women Artists (SWA) and the Andover Art Society, a member of Society of All Artists (SAA), Society for Floral Painting (SFP) and Wallop Artists.  She has won various awards, the most notable are the Daler Rowney Choice Awards at Society of Women Artists.

Soraya is a versatile artist working in watercolours, oils, pastels, acrylics and mixed media in a variety of subject matters such as musicians, café scenes and African market scenes amongst others. Many of her subjects are travel based and people in everyday life situations feature a great deal in her work, light and colour are the two important elements in her paintings together with semi abstract passages and a sense of ambiguity where she allows the viewer to make up the story.

Awards 
 Runner up in Test Valley Art’s Foundation Award at The Best of Hampshire 2009
 Test Valley Art’s Foundation Award for The Best Painting by a Hampshire Artist (Best of Hampshire Exhibition) at Sir Harold Hillier’s in November 2008
 Best Miniature Society of Floral Painters Mottisfont 2006
 Artist of the Year 2005 Artist & Illustrators exhibition
 Daler-Rowney Choice Award, Society of Women Artists, June 2004
 Winchester Art Club 76th annual exhibition November 2003
 Salisbury Open Award April 2003
 Fight for Sight regional competition November 2002
 Edwin Young Award April 2002
 Edwin Young Award Salisbury Open 1997 -The painting was purchased for the Edwin Young Museum collection

References

External links 
 Soraya French
 Wallop Artists

1957 births
Living people
English women painters
Iranian contemporary artists
Artist authors
Iranian women artists
Iranian artists
21st-century British women artists
20th-century English women
20th-century English people
21st-century English women
21st-century English people